Albbruck is a municipality of the district of Waldshut in Baden-Württemberg, Germany. It is on the southwestern border of Germany with Switzerland.

History
In 1805 during the process of German mediatisation, a restructuring of certain jurisdictions, Albbruck became a possession of the Grand Duchy of Baden. In 1939, the town was assigned to the district of Waldshut. Through much of this period, it was rural and agricultural.

Decades after World War II, beginning in the 1970s, Albbruck underwent a period of growth. Residential areas were developed on the west side of the town and commercial space to its north. A new town hall was constructed in 1973. The municipality also grew in geographic area in that period, adding , Buch, and Unteralpfen with Albbruck on 1 January 1975. A new town center was completed in 2000.

Geography
The municipality (Gemeinde) of Albbruck lies at the southern edge of the district of Waldshut in Baden-Württemberg, a state of the Federal Republic of Germany. It lies along the High Rhine and the national border with Switzerland, and extends from there north into the Hotzenwald. 

The municipality is crossed by the chine valleys of the Mühlbach and Alb rivers.  of the former is a Federally-protected nature reserve and the latter forms part of the municipality's northwest border.

Coat of arms
Albbruck's coat of arms depicts a blue river crossed by a bridge of red masonry, from which two fir trees grow, over a field of white. This pattern was first used in seals from the late 19th century, but was approved for official use by the Federal Ministry of the Interior on 2 November 1956. The pattern was again approved, this time by the Waldshut district office, on 13 May 1977, following the absorption of Birkingen, Buch, and Unteralpfen into Albbruck. The river on the shield is the Alb, a tributary of the High Rhine; their confluence is located in the town.

Twin towns
Albbruck has been twinned with Carmignano di Brenta, Italy, since 1959.

Transportation
The High Rhine Railway also passes through the municipality.

References

External links
  (in German)

Waldshut (district)
Baden
Germany–Switzerland border crossings
Hotzenwald